The Exodus Tour was a concert tour organised to support the album Exodus by Bob Marley & The Wailers.

The tour began at the Pavillon de Paris, Porte de Pantin in Paris, France, on 10 May 1977. During the tour, Marley performed for the first time in Belgium and Denmark. The tour ended in early June after four of the six shows planned at the Rainbow Theatre in London due to a serious toe injury Marley received in a football friendly game with French journalists just before the tour's start. The tour's second leg in the United States was first postponed and then cancelled. 

The final show has been released on VHS and DVD, labeled Live! at the Rainbow. It is reported that all four London shows have been recorded. The cancellation of the U.S. leg has been suggested as the main reason for Marley's underrated reputation there, as the Exodus album was Marley's route to international superstardom; being honoured as the Greatest Album of the Century by Time in 2000.

Setlist 
The standard setlist of the tour was the following:

 "Natural Mystic"
 "So Much Things to Say"
 "Guiltiness"
 "Trenchtown Rock"
 "Them Belly Full (But We Hungry)"
"Concrete Jungle"
 "I Shot the Sheriff"
 "Rebel Music (3 O'Clock Roadblock)"
 "Lively Up Yourself"
 "Crazy Baldhead" / "Running Away" (medley)
 "War" / "No More Trouble" (medley)
"The Heathen"
"Burnin' & Lootin'"
"Positive Vibration"
"No Woman, No Cry"
"Jamming"
"Get Up, Stand Up"
"Exodus"

The militant songs from the first side of the Exodus album had all been performed at least once before the tour, whilst performances of the soft love songs from the second side remained widely rare; only "Jammin'" had been performed a few times and later became a classic Marley tune and a standard of later tours. "Waiting In Vain" and "One Love / People Get Ready" had been performed at least once during the Kaya Tour in 1978, as had "Three Little Birds" at least once during the Uprising Tour in 1980). The tour featured performances of two songs which are not featured on any of previous Island albums: "Trenchtown Rock" (an early pre-Island song) and "Running Away" (a song released on the 1978 album Kaya).

During some shows, an additional song was added to the middle of the setlist (especially during the Rainbow Theatre shows when Marley widely varied the setlists), like "Stir It Up" "Jammin'", "Positive Vibration", "Concrete Jungle", "Crazy Baldhead", "Running Away", "Trenchtown Rock", "Natural Mystic", "So Much Things To Say" and "Guiltiness". Live performances of each of these songs happened very rarely during the tour. In 2020, the final concert was released on Marley's official YouTube channel.

Tour dates

Cancellations 
 5 June 1977: London, United Kingdom
 6 June 1977: London, United Kingdom

References

1977 concert tours
Bob Marley concert tours